Pullman–Standard Historic District is a national historic district located at Hammond, Lake County, Indiana.   The district encompasses 121 contributing buildings and 2 contributing sites in a predominantly residential section of Hammond. It developed between about 1916 and 1918, with some later additions, and includes notable example of Colonial Revival and Bungalow / American Craftsman styles of residential architecture. Most of the homes were originally constructed by the United States Housing Corporation as Industrial Housing Project No. 457. There are three main housing types: Single-family dwellings, duplexes, and quadplexes.

It was listed in the National Register of Historic Places in 2012.

References

Historic districts on the National Register of Historic Places in Indiana
Colonial Revival architecture in Indiana
Historic districts in Hammond, Indiana
National Register of Historic Places in Lake County, Indiana